Mpingo may refer to:
 Dalbergia melanoxylon, also known as African blackwood, a flowering plant in the family Fabaceae
 Mpingo, Mozambique, a village in Ancuabe District in Cabo Delgado Province in northeastern Mozambique
 BD+00 316, a F-type main sequence star